The 2011 Mr. Olympia contest was an IFBB professional bodybuilding competition and the feature event of Joe Weider's Olympia Fitness & Performance Weekend 2011 held September 15–18, 2011 at the Las Vegas Convention Center and Orleans Arena in Las Vegas, Nevada.  It was the 47th Mr. Olympia competition.  Other events at the exhibition included the 202 Olympia Showdown, 
Ms. Olympia, Fitness Olympia, and Figure Olympia contests.

Results

Notable events

Jay Cutler tore his left biceps several weeks before the competition, the injury impacted his conditioning and later required surgery to repair
Phil Heath won his first championship in his fourth Mr. Olympia competition

See also
 2011 Ms. Olympia

References

External links 
 Mr. Olympia

 2011
Mr. Olympia
Mr. Olympia 2011
2011 in bodybuilding
Mr. Olympia 2011